Woodson is a village in Morgan County, Illinois, United States. The population was 512 at the 2010 census. It is part of the Jacksonville Micropolitan Statistical Area.

History 
The village was platted on May 2, 1859, and incorporated on April 9, 1894. The village is named after Judge David M. Woodson.

Geography
Woodson is located south of Lake Jacksonville and south of combined U.S. Route 36 and Interstate 72. It lies next to State Highway 267.

Demographics

As of the census of 2000, there were 559 people, 209 households, and 165 families residing in the village. The racial makeup of the village was 96.96% White, 0.72% African American, 0.36% Native American, 0.36% Asian, 0.54% from other races, and 1.07% from two or more races. Hispanic or Latino of any race were 0.89% of the population.

There were 209 households, out of which 44.0% had children under the age of 18 living with them, 65.1% were married couples living together, 12.4% had a female householder with no husband present, and 20.6% were non-families. 16.7% of all households were made up of individuals, and 6.7% had someone living alone who was 65 years of age or older. The average household size was 2.67 and the average family size was 2.99.

In the village, the population was spread out, with 28.1% under the age of 18, 8.8% from 18 to 24, 30.8% from 25 to 44, 24.7% from 45 to 64, and 7.7% who were 65 years of age or older. The median age was 35 years. For every 100 females, there were 96.8 males. For every 100 females age 18 and over, there were 85.3 males.

The median income for a household in the village was $41,500, and the median income for a family was $44,375. Males had a median income of $35,435 versus $20,000 for females. The per capita income for the village was $17,175. About 4.2% of families and 6.2% of the population were below the poverty line, including 7.4% of those under age 18 and 9.7% of those age 65 or over.

References

1859 establishments in Illinois
Jacksonville, Illinois micropolitan area
Populated places established in 1859
Villages in Morgan County, Illinois
Villages in Illinois